Adrian Nicole LeBlanc is an American journalist whose works focus on the marginalized members of society: adolescents living in poverty, prostitutes, women in prison, etc.  She is best known for her 2003 non-fiction book Random Family. She was a recipient of the MacArthur Fellowship—popularly known as the "Genius Grant"—in 2006.

Background and education
LeBlanc grew up in a working-class family in Leominster, Massachusetts.  She studied at Smith College, Oxford, and Yale University.  She worked for Seventeen Magazine as an editor after earning her master's degree in modern literature at Oxford.

Random Family
LeBlanc's first book, Random Family: Love, Drugs, Trouble, and Coming of Age in the Bronx, took more than 10 years to research and write.  Random Family is a nonfiction account of the struggles of two women and their family as they deal with love, drug dealers, babies and prison time in the Bronx.  LeBlanc and Random Family garnered several awards and nominations.  Her research methods earned her a spot among several other journalists and nonfiction writers in Robert Boynton's book, New New Journalism.

Career

Journalism
LeBlanc has contributed to the New York Times Magazine, the Village Voice, the New Yorker and Esquire magazine.  She currently lives in Manhattan.

Academic
Adrian Nicole LeBlanc was a Holtzbrinck Fellow at the American Academy in Berlin, Germany, for Spring 2009. She is a visiting scholar at the Arthur L. Carter Journalism Institute at New York University 2009–2010.  She was part of the Harman Writer-in-Residence Program at Baruch College in Spring 2011.

Other publications
Gang Girl: When Manny’s Locked-Up (August, 1994)
Landing From the Sky (The New Yorker, April 23, 2000)
When the Man of the House is in the Big House (Cover, January, 2003)

Sidelines (About the work of Swiss artist Uwe Wittwer, in Geblendet / Dazzled: Kehrer, Heidelberg, 2005)
 'The Ground We Lived On': A Father's Last Days (documenting the last months of her father's life, on NPR's All Things Considered, 2006)

Awards 
Margolis Award (2000
Lettre Ulysses Award (2003)
New York Times Best Books of the Year (2003)
Borders Original Voices Award for Nonfiction
MacArthur Fellow (2006)

References

External links
margolis.com
lettre-ulysses-award.org
macfound.org
Adrian Nicole LeBlanc on NPR about Random Family
The New York Times Book Review on Random Family
Adrian Nicole LeBlanc website
Robert S. Boynton in The New Journalism on Adrian LeBlanc and Random Family
Adrian Nicole LeBlanc in The New York Times Magazine on Education in Hollywood

American women journalists
Living people
Year of birth missing (living people)
MacArthur Fellows
Smith College alumni
Alumni of the University of Oxford
Yale University alumni
21st-century American women